Erika Padilla (born November 22, 1986) is a Filipino actress, TV host, model and sideline reporter.

Early life
Padilla's father is General Ricardo Ilagan Padilla, a former regional director of Region 4 Calabarzon and the incumbent Mayor of Bongabon, Nueva Ecija. Her mother is a businesswoman and a former dancer and singer.

Career
In 2008, Padilla joined the Miss Bikini Philippines pageant where she won the Miss Photogenic award. She and the other contestants of the pageant made a guest appearance on the TV show Wowowee. In the show, she met Johnny Manahan, who offered her to audition for Star Magic. Before signing up with Star Magic, and eventually launching as a member of Star Magic Batch 16, Padilla did several modelling stints. She was part of Metro magazine's top 10 models in the Philippines.

Padilla appeared as a court side reporter for the PBA on TV5, her first project outside the Kapamilya network. She was the backstage host of Killer Karaoke: Pinoy Naman. She also played supporting roles in some of the network's shows. She still appeared in ABS-CBN shows like A Beautiful Affair and Maria Mercedes.

She is currently a freelance actress/television host signed to Vidanes Artist Management.

In 2014, she joined GMA Network for the first time and appeared in Kambal Sirena and Ang Lihim ni Annasandra.

After doing projects with GMA Network, she played Betty Mae Versales in the 2015 version of Pangako Sa 'Yo aired on ABS-CBN. The show ran from May 2015 to February 2016.

During 2016, she returned to GMA Network as part of the rom-com - drama series, Juan Happy Love Story.

As of 2017, Padilla is currently seen on ABS-CBN shows and programs.

Personal life
Padilla is a graduate of Ateneo de Manila University, where she studied political science.

Padilla is currently engaged to Alaska Aces coach and former Philippine Basketball Association player Jeff Cariaso. Padilla gave birth to her son on September 7, 2017.

Filmography

Television

Film

References

External links

1986 births
Living people
Star Magic
Ateneo de Manila University alumni
Philippine Basketball Association broadcasters
People from Marikina
Actresses from Metro Manila
Filipino beauty pageant winners